The 24th Army Corps was an Army corps in the Imperial Russian Army.

Composition
48th Infantry Division
49th Infantry Division

Part of
8th Army: 1914 - 1915
3rd Army: 1915
8th Army: 1915 - 1916
4th Army: 1916
10th Army: 1916
9th Army: 1916 - 1917
4th Army: 1917

Commanders 
 07.06.1910 — 20.01.1913 : Aleksandr Gerngross
 29.01.1913 — 02.01.1914 : Georgy Berchman
 02.01.1914 — end 1916 : Afanasy Tsurikov
 end 1916 — 08.1917 : Konstantin Nekrasov
 09.09.1917 — 30.09.1917 : Nikolai Bredov
 09.1917 - : Vjaceslav Trojanov

Corps of the Russian Empire